Saloni Daini is an Indian television actress and stand-up comedian, having started her career as a child actress. She is best known for playing the character Gangubai in various comedy TV shows. She is claimed to be one of the youngest comic stars on TV. She has faced the camera from the age of three, acting in Marathi serials and Marathi and Hindi films, and has released a music album for Disney. She also mimics film stars and politicians, and was seen in the promos of Shah Rukh Khan's Kya Aap Paanchvi Pass Se Tez Hain. In 2010, she appeared on Comedy Circus Mahasangram. She also featured in video series called Main 13 Hoon in June 2015 where among others, Saloni mimes Arnab Goswami pretty well along with Kajol and Sonam Kapoor.

Career
Daini appeared in various Indian stand-up comedy TV shows as child comedian. She played a fictional maid, Gangubai, in many of her stand-up comedy shows and people recognize her as Gangubai.

Filmography

Films

Television

References

External links 
 
 

Living people
Indian stand-up comedians
Indian child actresses
Actresses in Marathi cinema
Actresses in Hindi cinema
21st-century Indian actresses
Women humorists
Year of birth missing (living people)